Huddersfield Town's 1945–46 campaign was mainly played in the still active Wartime League, but the FA Cup was revived for the 1945–46 season in a two-leg format. Town went out in the third round to Sheffield United.

Players used during the two legs

Review
It was the first and so far, only season in which a 2-leg system was used in the competition. Town were out in Round 3 with a 1–1 draw at Leeds Road, followed by a 2–0 loss at Bramall Lane, which made them lose 3–1 on aggregate.

Results

Wartime League North

FA Cup

FA Cup appearances and goals

Huddersfield Town A.F.C. seasons
Huddersfield Town